North DeSoto High School is a high school in Stonewall, Louisiana, United States, in DeSoto Parish.  It belongs to the DeSoto Parish School Board district.

Athletics
North DeSoto High athletics competes in the LHSAA.

References

Education in DeSoto Parish, Louisiana
Public high schools in Louisiana